Bob Masefield (born 19 August 1955) is a New Zealand cricketer. He played in one first-class match for Canterbury in 1984/85.

See also
 List of Canterbury representative cricketers

References

External links
 

1955 births
Living people
New Zealand cricketers
Canterbury cricketers
Sportspeople from Akaroa